Ivashchenko is a Ukrainian surname which may refer to:

Yuri Ivashchenko (born 1961), Ukrainian astronomer
Valeriy Ivashchenko (born 1956),  Deputy Minister of Defense of Ukraine in 2007–2009
Elena Ivashchenko (born 1984 ), Russian judoka
Oleksandr Ivashchenko (born 1985), Ukrainian football player

See also
 

Ukrainian-language surnames